"One Fine Morning" is the second single released off of Lighthouse's 1971 album, One Fine Morning. The song is one of the band's most successful singles, making the top of the charts in Canada, and becoming their most popular single released in the United States.

Charts

Weekly charts

Year-end charts

References

External links
 Lyrics of this song
 

1971 songs
1971 singles
Lighthouse (band) songs
Song recordings produced by Jimmy Ienner